Still Live after All These Years is a live album from North Carolina music group Nantucket, recorded November 29, 1991 with all six original band members at a night club called The Longbranch in Raleigh, North Carolina. There were twenty songs on the original 1995 album (though some other sources say seventeen), including a new studio release, but only sixteen songs are on the latest re-release by the band's own label Zella Records.

Track listing
Rugburn - 4:08
It's Getting Harder - 3:48
Born in a Honky Tonk - 4:44
What's the Matter with Loving You - 5:07
On the Radio - 3:28
Southern Gals - 5:59
50 More - 5:31
Time Bomb - 3:20
Is It Wrong to Rock and Roll - 6:06
Heartbreaker - 8:36
Quite Like You - 3:45
I Can't Stop Loving You - 4:53
Your Place or Mine - 3:45
California - 4:58
Never Gonna Take Your Lies - 3:51
Real Romance - 5:24

Other tracks included on original release
Party Girl Deluxe [Track #9]
Shotgun [Track #15]
I Saw Elvis (At The Burger King) [Track #16]
Sugar Shack [Track #20]

All other songs on album remained in same order.

Personnel
Tommy Redd: Lead & Rhythm Guitars, Lead & Background Vocals
Larry Uzzell: Lead & Background Vocals, Trumpet, Percussion
Mike Uzzell: Moog Bass, Various Keyboards & Synthesizers, Lead & Background Vocals
Eddie Blair: Saxophones, Keyboards, Percussion, Background Vocals
Kenny Soule: Drums & Percussion, Background Vocals
Mark Downing: Lead & Rhythm Guitars

Additional musicians
Michael Gardner: Guitar
David "Thumbs" Johnson: Bass

References
 Nantucket - A Band Of Desperate Men. Nantucket: Credits. Retrieved Apr. 22, 2007.
 The Daily Reflector. Nantucket: Credits. Retrieved Apr. 22, 2007.

External links
 
 Nantucket on Myspace

Nantucket (band) albums
1995 live albums